Kate Robertshaw (born 13 September 1990) is a British badminton player. She competed for England in the mixed team event at the 2014 Commonwealth Games where she won a silver medal.

Achievements

BWF International Challenge/Series
Women's doubles

 BWF International Challenge tournament
 BWF International Series tournament
 BWF Future Series tournament

References

External links 
 
 

1990 births
Living people
Sportspeople from Leeds
English female badminton players
Badminton players at the 2014 Commonwealth Games
Commonwealth Games silver medallists for England
Commonwealth Games medallists in badminton
Medallists at the 2014 Commonwealth Games